Pleše is a settlement in the hills east of Škofljica in central Slovenia. The Municipality of Škofljica is part of the traditional region of Lower Carniola and is now included in the Central Slovenia Statistical Region.

Name
Pleše was attested in historical sources as Ples in 1463, Plebss in 1468, and Pless in 1482.

References

External links

Pleše on Geopedia

Populated places in the Municipality of Škofljica